Four Frightened People is a 1934 American Pre-Code adventure film directed by Cecil B. DeMille and starring Claudette Colbert, Herbert Marshall, Mary Boland, and William Gargan. It is based on the 1931 novel by E. Arnot Robertson.

Plot
The film tells the story of two men (Marshall and Gargan) and two women (Colbert and Boland), who leave from a plague-ridden ship and reach the Malayan jungle. The relationships between the four people before they enter the jungle are examined and are transformed as they interact with natural phenomena and the natives who populate the jungle. The film also relates how each of the four people carried on in life after they emerged from the jungle.

Cast
Claudette Colbert as Judy Jones
Herbert Marshall as Arnold Ainger
Mary Boland as Mrs. Mardick
William Gargan as Stewart Corder
Leo Carrillo as Montague
Nella Walker as Mrs. Ainger
Tetsu Komai as Native Chief
Chris-Pin Martin as Native Boatman
Joe De La Cruz as Native
Minoru Nishida as Native
Teru Shimada as Native
E.R. Jinedas as Native
Delmar Costello as Sakais
Ethel Griffies as Mrs. Ainger's Mother

Filming locations
Hilo, Island of Hawai'i, Hawaii

Production crew
Executive producer (uncredited) – Emanuel Cohen
Art Direction – Roland Anderson
Production Manager (uncredited) – Roy Burns
Assistant Director (uncredited) – Cullen Tate, James Dugan
Sound Mixer (uncredited) – Harry Lindgren
Double (uncredited) – Mildred Mernie as Claudette Colbert, Bruce Warren as Herbert Marshall, Leota Lorraine as Mary Boland, Carl Mudge as William Gargan, Curley Dresden as Leo Carrillo

Reception
The film was a box office disappointment for Paramount.

Home media
This film, along with  The Sign of the Cross, Cleopatra, The Crusades and Union Pacific, was released on DVD in 2006 by Universal Studios as part of The Cecil B. DeMille Collection.

References

External links

Stills at pre-code.com

1934 films
American black-and-white films
Films directed by Cecil B. DeMille
Films based on British novels
Paramount Pictures films
1934 adventure films
Films set in Malaysia
American adventure films
Films scored by Karl Hajos
Films scored by Heinz Roemheld
1930s American films